Käina Bay-Kassari Landscape Conservation Area is a nature park situated in Hiiu County, Estonia.

Its area is 5681 ha.

The protected area was designated in 1962 to protect Käina Bay and Kassari island semi-natural communities. In 1998, the protected area was redesigned to the landscape conservation area.

References

Nature reserves in Estonia
Geography of Hiiu County